Doljani (Serbian Cyrillic: Дољани) is a village in the municipality of Bihać, Bosnia and Herzegovina.

History
In June 1858, Pecija's First Revolt broke out in Knešpolje, that expanded into the Bosanska Krajina and on 4 July, a battle was fought in the village in which 100 Turks were killed by Serb rebels.

Demographics 
According to the 2013 census, its population was nil, down from 154 in 1991.

References

Populated places in Bihać